The final stages of the 2011 Copa Bridgestone Sudamericana de Clubes consisted of four stages:
Round of 16 (first legs: September 28–29, October 5, 19; second legs: October 12, 19–20, 25–26)
Quarterfinals (first legs: November 1–3; second legs: November 9–10, 17)
Semifinals (first legs: November 23–24; second legs: November 29–30)
Finals (first leg: December 8; second leg: December 14)

Format
The defending champion, Independiente, and the fifteen winners of the second stage (three from Argentina, four from Brazil, eight from rest of South America) qualified for the final stages. The sixteen teams played a single-elimination tournament, and were seeded depending on which second stage tie they won (i.e., the winner of Match O1 would be assigned the 1 seed, etc.; Independiente were assigned the 5 seed). In each stage, teams played in two-legged ties on a home-away basis, with the higher-seeded team playing the second leg at home. Each team earned 3 points for a win, 1 point for a draw, and 0 points for a loss. The following criteria were used for breaking ties on points, except for the final:
Goal difference
Away goals
Penalty shootout (no extra time is played)

For the final, the first tiebreaker was goal difference. If had tied on goal difference, the away goals rule would not have been applied, and 30 minutes of extra time would have been played. If still had tied after extra time, the title would have been decided by penalty shootout.

If two teams from the same association reach the semifinals, they would be forced to play each other.

Bracket
In each tie, the higher-seeded team played the second leg at home.

Round of 16
Team 1 played the second leg at home.

|-

|}

Round of 16 Match 1

Vélez Sársfield won on points 4–1.

Round of 16 Match 2

Santa Fe won on points 4–1.

Round of 16 Match 3

Tied on points 3–3, LDU Quito won on goal difference.

Round of 16 Match 4

Tied on points 3–3, Libertad won on goal difference.

Round of 16 Match 5

Universidad de Chile won on points 6–0.

Round of 16 Match 6

Arsenal won on points 4–1.

Round of 16 Match 7

Tied on points 2–2, Universitario won on penalties.

Round of 16 Match 8

Tied on points 3–3, Vasco da Gama won on goal difference.

Quarterfinals
Team 1 played the second leg at home.

|-

|}

Quarterfinal Match 1

Vélez Sársfield won on points 4–1.

Quarterfinal Match 2

Tied on points 3–3, LDU Quito won on penalties.

Quarterfinal Match 3

Universidad de Chile won on points 6–0.

Quarterfinal Match 4

Tied on points 3–3, Vasco da Gama won on goal difference.

Semifinals
Team 1 played the second leg at home.

|-

|}

Semifinal Match 1

Universidad de Chile won on points 4–1.

Semifinal Match 2

LDU Quito won on points 6–0.

Finals

The Finals were played over two legs, with the higher-seeded team playing the second leg at home. If the teams were tied on points and goal difference at the end of regulation in the second leg, the away goals rule would not be applied and 30 minutes of extra time would be played. If still tied after extra time, the title would be decided by penalty shootout.

Universidad de Chile won on points 6–0.

References

External links
Official webpage 

Final Stages